Callum Watson (born 28 February 2000) is an English football player who plays for HFX Wanderers FC in the Canadian Premier League.

Early life
Watson played youth football with Colchester United for five years, until he was sixteen, when he was released due to being too small. Afterwards, he then joined the AFC Sudbury academy program.

College career
In 2018, Watson headed to the United States, through the U.S Sports Scholarships organization, which helps English footballers attend an American post-secondary institution to earn a degree and play college soccer. He joined Hastings College and played for their men's soccer team in the NAIA. He made his debut on October 26, 2018 against the Bethany Bison, scoring his first goal and adding two assists in a 5-0 victory. In his first season, he won the conference title as well as the conference tournament title. He was named a GPAC First Team All-Star in both 2018 and 2019. In 2019, he helped the team to a second place finish at the national NAIA Men's Soccer Championship and earned  All-Tournament Team honours and was also named a First Team All-America. During his two seasons with Hastings, he scored 14 goals and added 28 assists in 38 matches.

In December 2019, it was announced that he would transfer to Creighton University, beginning classes in January, and joining the men's soccer team in the NCAA in the fall. He recorded his first assist on March 17, 2021 against the Butler Bulldogs. On March 29, 2021, he scored his first goal for Creighton in a 3-1 victory over the Kansas City Roos. He was named to the All-Big East Second Team for the 2021 Spring season (which occurred as the regular 2020 fall season was postponed due to the COVID-19 pandemic). In October 2021, he was named the Big East Offensive Player of the Week. After the 2021 Fall season, he was named to the USCA All-East Region Third Team as well as the All-BIG EAST Second Team for the second time. After his final season in 2022, he was named to the All-Big East Third Team.

Club career
On 6 October 2016, made his senior debut with AFC Sudbury in the seventh tier Isthmian League Premier Division against Kingstonian. He made a further ten appearances the following season, including scoring in an FA Trophy draw against Aylesbury United on 7 October 2017.

In January 2023, he briefly returned to AFC Sudbury, now in the eighth tier Isthmian League North Division. However, he soon after signed a professional contract and instead remained with Sudbury on a training stint, without appearing in matches to avoid injury risk.

In January 2023, Watson signed with Canadian Premier League club HFX Wanderers for the 2023 season, with an option for 2024. He had received offers to attend preseason with Major League Soccer clubs Real Salt Lake and Houston Dynamo FC, but instead opted to sign the guaranteed contract with the Wanderers instead.

Career statistics

Club

Notes

References

Living people
2000 births
Association football midfielders
English footballers
Colchester United F.C. players
A.F.C. Sudbury players
Creighton Bluejays men's soccer players
HFX Wanderers FC players
Isthmian League players
Canadian Premier League players